Hilton A. Green (March 3, 1929 – October 2, 2013), also known as Hilton Green, was an American film producer and assistant director.

He was best known for being the assistant director of Alfred Hitchcock's Psycho (1960), Marnie, and many episodes of Alfred Hitchcock Presents.

He is the son of director Alfred E. Green and actress Vivian Reed. Green went on to produce such films as Psycho II, Psycho III, Psycho IV: The Beginning, Home Alone 3, and Sixteen Candles. He began his career as an assistant director after completing college. His early work was mainly with TV shows

Filmography

References

External links

1929 births
American film producers
2013 deaths